The Drumian is a stage of the Miaolingian Series of the Cambrian. It succeeds the Wuliuan and precedes the Guzhangian. The base is defined as the first appearance of the trilobite Ptychagnostus atavus around  million years ago. The top is defined as the first appearance of another trilobite Lejopyge laevigata around  million years ago.

The GSSP is defined in the Drumian section in the Drum Mountains, Millard County, Utah, United States. The stage was also named after the Drum Mountains. The section is an outcrop of the Wheeler Formation, a succession of calcareous shales.

References

 
Cambrian geochronology
Geological ages
Cambrian United States